Bjarne Petersen (born 5 April 1952) is a Danish former football player, who was the top goalscorer of the 1975 Danish football championship while playing for Kjøbenhavns Boldklub. He played one game for the Denmark national under-21 football team.

External links
Danish national team profile

1952 births
Living people
Danish men's footballers
Kjøbenhavns Boldklub players
Denmark under-21 international footballers
Association football forwards